Rogha: The Best of Clannad is the fourth greatest hits album released by Irish group Clannad. The word rogha is the Irish word for "choice"; it's pronounced row-ah (row as in an argument).

Track listing
"Newgrange"
"Second Nature"
"Closer to Your Heart"
"Seachrán Charn tSiaill"
"Ancient Forest"
"Now Is Here"
"Something to Believe In"
"In Search of a Heart"
"Buachaill Ón Éirne"
"Northern Skyline"
"Together We"
"Tá 'Mé Mo Shuí"
"Blackstairs"
"Indoor"
"Thíos Fá'n Chósta"
"In a Lifetime"
"Theme from Harry's Game"
"The Fairy Queen"
"Journey's End"

1996 greatest hits albums
Clannad compilation albums